McCoy Run is a  long 1st order tributary to Little Wheeling Creek in Ohio County, West Virginia.

Course 
McCoy Run rises about 1 mile northwest of Valley Camp, West Virginia, in Ohio County and then flows southeast to join Little Wheeling Creek at Valley Camp.

Watershed 
McCoy Run drains  of area, receives about 41.0 in/year of precipitation, has a wetness index of 257.47, and is about 78% forested.

See also 
 List of rivers of West Virginia

References 

Rivers of Ohio County, West Virginia
Rivers of West Virginia